Empis soror is a species of fly in the family Empididae. It is included in the subgenus Polyblepharis. It is found in the Palearctic.

References

Empis
Diptera of Europe
Taxa named by James Edward Collin
Insects described in 1937